Winbond Electronics Corporation is a Taiwan-based corporation founded in 1987. It produces semiconductors and several types of integrated circuits, most notably Dynamic RAM, Static RAM, Serial flash, microcontrollers and personal computer ICs ( namely Super I/O chips). Winbond is currently the largest brand-name integrated circuit supplier in Taiwan and one of the biggest suppliers of semiconductor solutions worldwide.

Computer IC, Consumer Electronics IC and Logic Product Foundry of Winbond product lines have been spun off as Nuvoton Technology Corporation on 1 July 2008.

See also
 List of Semiconductor Fabrication Plants
 List of companies of Taiwan

External links 
 
 Nuvoton Technology Corporation (Winbond subsidiary)

1987 establishments in Taiwan
Computer memory companies
Companies established in 1987
Electronics companies of Taiwan
Taiwanese brands
Companies listed on the Taiwan Stock Exchange
Semiconductor companies of Taiwan